WOW The 90s is part of the WOW series.

All of the songs in this collection were contemporary Christian music hits during the decade of the 1990s.  An album titled: WOW Classics was planned for release in May 1998.  It had been intended to include the 30 biggest hits in Christian music from 1990-1995, but was never issued.  Marketing and distribution responsibilities for this title in the WOW Hits series were relegated to Word Entertainment.  In 1999 WOW The 90s reached #84 on the Billboard 200 chart, and #2 on the Top Contemporary Christian album chart.

Track listing

Disc one
 Keep the Candle Burning - Point of Grace
 Awesome God - Rich Mullins
 People Get Ready - Crystal Lewis
 The Great Adventure - Steven Curtis Chapman
 That's What Love Is For - Amy Grant
 Place in This World - Michael W. Smith
 On My Knees- Jaci Velasquez
 My Will - DC Talk
 God Is in Control - Twila Paris
 Another Time, Another Place - Sandi Patti, Wayne Watson
 Basics of Life - 4HIM
 In Christ Alone - Michael English
 Deep Enough to Dream - Chris Rice
 Adonai - Avalon
 Serve the Lord - Carman

Disc two
 Under the Influence - Anointed
 Shine - Newsboys
 Jesus Freak- DC Talk
 God So Loved - Jaci Velasquez
 I Surrender All - Clay Crosse
 I Will Be Here - Steven Curtis Chapman
 Sometimes By Step - Rich Mullins
 The Great Divide - Point of Grace
 When God's People Pray - Wayne Watson
 I Will Be Here for You - Michael W. Smith
 Where There Is Faith - 4HIM
 Everything Changes - Kathy Troccoli
 Liquid - Jars of Clay
 Lover of My Soul - Amy Grant
 Crucified With Christ - Phillips, Craig & Dean

See also
 The WOW series

References

External links 
 WOW Hits online

WOW series albums
1999 compilation albums